This is the discography of American rapper Slim Thug from Houston, Texas.

Albums

Studio albums

Collaborative albums

Extended plays

Mixtapes

Singles

As lead artist

As featured artist

Promotional singles

Guest appearances

See also
 Boss Hogg Outlawz discography

References

External links 
 Slim Thug discography at Discogs

Hip hop discographies
Discographies of American artists